Otroea is a genus of longhorn beetles of the subfamily Lamiinae, containing the following species:

 Otroea cinerascens Pascoe, 1866
 Otroea semiflava Pascoe, 1866

References

Desmiphorini